The Bank of Punjab is a Pakistani bank which is based in Lahore, Pakistan. It serves Pakistan and functions as an International Bank and is one of the prominent financial institutions of the country holding AA ratings from Pakistan Credit Rating Agency (PACRA).

History
The Bank was established in October 1989, pursuant to The Bank of Punjab Act 1989, and was given the status of a Retail bank in 1994.

Overview
The Bank of Punjab was founded by Tajammal Hussain and it functions as a Scheduled Commercial Bank, with a network of over 587 branches in Major Business centres throughout the country. It is the seventh largest Commercial Bank of the Country. It provides a wide range of banking services including deposit in Local Currency; client deposit in foreign currency; Remittances; and advances to Business, Trade, Industry and Agriculture. First Punjab Modaraba (FPM), a wholly owned subsidiary of the bank, was established in 1992, and is being managed by Punjab Modaraba Services (Pvt) Ltd.

Currently, the Bank of Punjab is headed by Zafar Masud who joined as President and CEO on April 16, 2020, after being appointed by the Government of Punjab, Pakistan earlier and later being approved by the State Bank of Pakistan.

Market maker 
Pakistan Stock Exchange designated Bank of Punjab a Market Maker for debt securities.

Partnerships and Acquisitions

Lahore Qalandars Partnership (January, 2022) 

The Bank of Punjab, in Partnership with PSL Franchise Lahore Qalandars, Launched an Affinity Debit Card Lahore Qalandars Debit Card (LQDC) to facilitate Cricket Fans in General. 

1Link Partnership (March, 2019)

The Bank of Punjab Partnered with 1Link -  PSO/PSP, payment and switch system in Pakistan – to digitize Punjab Employees’ Social Security Institution (PESSI) to allow employees to collect, disperse or share payments across the county, using digital channels.

Punjab Safe Cities Authority (October, 2018)

The Bank of Punjab Partnered with Punjab Safe Cities Authority in October 2018 to power E-Challan Collection through automated monitoring system installed across Lahore. The service will allow Punjab Government subsidiaries such as Traffic Police to Collect Challan right at the spot with ease.

Karandaaz Pakistan (January 2015)

The Bank of Punjab signed a memo (MoU) with Karandaaz Pakistan – an Investment Platform for Businesses – to allow Government to Digitize their payments. The deal will facilitate citizens of Pakistan to conduct digital transactions, enabled by Karandaaz tech, and grow a suite of digital financial services to support both Government and Citizens.

References

See Also
The Nation, August 28, 2006: The Bank of Punjab
Daily Times, November 11, 2003: Bank of Punjab introduces e-banking
The Bank of Punjab Annual Report 2013
Daily Times, September 07, 2022: Unfounded complaints against the Bank of Punjab and its staff
Asia Money, Pakistan: Bank of Punjab makes a national splash
HBL, BoP, Bank Islami, U Bank ranked highest in agriculture credit performance FY22
BOP half-year net profit down
BOP partners with MC Lahore to construct highest flag posts
BoP supports Mazdoor Card initiative

External links 

 Bank of Punjab website

Pakistani companies established in 1989
Banks established in 1989
Banks of Pakistan
Companies based in Lahore
Companies listed on the Pakistan Stock Exchange
Government-owned banks of Pakistan